Statistics of the V-League in the 1989 season.

Group 1

Group 2

Group 3

Semifinals
Cau Lac Bo Quan Doi 1-0 Cong An Hanoi           
Dong Thap           0-0 Dien Haiphong          [4-3 on pens]

Third place match
Cong An Hanoi       2-1 Dien Haiphong

Final
Dong Thap           1-0 Cau Lac Bo Quan Doi

References

Vietnamese Super League seasons
1
Viet
Viet